Handball Käerjeng, formerly known as HBC Bascharage is a handball club from Bascharage, Luxembourg, that plays in the Luxembourgish Handball League.

Titles 

Sales Lentz League :
 Winners (2) : 2014; 2018
 Runner-Up (5) : 2004, 2008, 2013, 2015, 2016

Luxembourg Handball Cup :
 Winners (1) : 2004, 2008, 2015, 2016
 Runner-Up (6) : 1998, 2002, 2003, 2011, 2012, 2014

European record

Team

Current squad 
Squad for the 2016–17 season

Goalkeepers
 Chris Auger
 Razvan Constantin Cenusa 
 Jerome Michels 

Wingers
RW & LW
  Jeff Brix 
  Tommaso Cosanti
  Mikel Molitor 
  Duc Vinh Nguyen
  Loris Nicoletti
  Carlo Sperti
  Jacques Tironzelli
Line players 
  Eric Schroeder
  Milašin Trivić
  Alex Wasmes

Back players
LB & RB
  Alexandru Cioban 
  Pol Freres
  Bob Jacoby
  Ivano Bianchini
  Vladimir Temelkov
  Francesco Volpi
CB 
  Marek Hummel
  Tom Meis

External links
Official website 

Handball Käerjeng
Käerjeng